Zubovo is a rural locality (a village) in Yeremeyevsky Selsoviet, Chishminsky District, Bashkortostan, Russia. The population was 6 as of 2010. There is 1 street.

Geography 
Zubovo is located 9 km northwest of Chishmy (the district's administrative centre) by road. Kavetka is the nearest rural locality.

References 

Rural localities in Chishminsky District